The South Concho River is one of the few rivers in Texas to run south to north for its entire length. When released, the river flows through Lake Nasworthy, and continues north to join the North Concho River at Bell St. in east San Angelo. The river is known for its cool, clear, deep water and its pecan-covered banks. Watercress grows in the shallows along the banks.

Because it is unique in the southwestern landscape, it was a landmark favored by both Indians and early Anglo travelers. An important stopover on the Comanche War Trail, the South Concho was also a welcome resting place for early Anglos heading west across Texas. Susan Peak, a unique mesa on the southern Edwards Plateau is located just southeast of Anson Springs, making the springs particularly easy for early travelers to locate.

Today, the South Concho River is a popular recreational spot for residents in the area. The public can access the water at Pugh Park or the low-water crossing in Christoval, Texas. Public access is also possible at the Mineral Wells crossing, some 2 miles north of Christoval. These parks are maintained by Tom Green County, and offer free access to the river. Overnight camping is allowed in the parks.

See also
List of rivers of Texas

References

External links
 Community Photo Album of the South Concho River

Rivers of Texas
Rivers of Tom Green County, Texas